Parliamentary elections were held in Chile on 2 March 1969. The Christian Democratic Party lost their majority in the Chamber of Deputies, but remained the largest party in both houses.

Electoral system
The term length for Senators was eight years, with around half of the Senators elected every four years. This election saw 25 of the 50 Senate seats up for election.

Results

Senate

Chamber of Deputies

References

Elections in Chile
Chile
Parliamentary
Presidency of Eduardo Frei Montalva
Chile
Election and referendum articles with incomplete results